The Indian Journal of Community Medicine is a peer-reviewed open-access medical journal published by Medknow Publications  on behalf of the Indian Association of Preventive & Social Medicine. The journal publishes articles on family health care, epidemiology, biostatistics, public health administration, health care delivery, national health problems, medical anthropology, and social medicine.

Abstracting and indexing 
The journal is abstracted and indexed by Abstracts on Hygiene and Communicable Diseases, CAB Abstracts, EBSCO, EmCare, Expanded Academic ASAP,  Global Health, Health & Wellness Research Center, Health Reference Center Academic, IndMed, MedIND, PubMed, SafetyLit, Scopus, SIIC databases, Tropical Diseases Bulletin, and Ulrich's Periodicals Directory.

See also
 Open access in India

External links

References 

Open access journals
Quarterly journals
English-language journals
Public health journals
Medknow Publications academic journals
Publications established in 1985
Academic journals associated with learned and professional societies of India
1985 establishments in India